Dominik Moll (born 7 May 1962) is a German-born French film director and screenwriter. He was born in Bühl, West Germany.

In 2001, he won the César Award for Best Director for Harry, He's Here to Help. Both Lemming and Harry, He's Here to Help were selected to compete for the Palme d'Or at the Cannes Film Festival. In 2023, Moll won the César Award for Best Director for his film The Night of the 12th, which also won Best Film at the 48th César Awards.

Life and career
Moll was born to a German father and a French mother. After spending his childhood in Germany, Moll studied film at the City College of New York and the French National Film School (IDHEC). He then worked as assistant editor, editor and assistant director, among others with Marcel Ophuls and Laurent Cantet. His debut feature film, Intimité, was released in 1994. In 2000, his second feature film, Harry, He's Here to Help, was screened in official competition at the Cannes Film Festival. His third film, Lemming, was chosen to open the Cannes Film Festival in 2005. 

At the 48th César Awards in 2023, Moll's film The Night of the 12th won the César Award for Best Film, and earned him the César Award for Best Director as well, the second in his career.

Filmography

References

External links

French film directors
French male screenwriters
French screenwriters
1962 births
Living people
Best Director César Award winners